Bengt-Göran Fernström (born 12 May 1941) is a retired Swedish sprinter. He competed in the 4 × 400 m relay at the 1962 European Athletics Championships and finished in fourth place. Individually he won three national titles: in the 200 m (1962) and 400 m (1962–1963). His daughters Maria, Helena and Linda also competed in sprint running.

References

1941 births
Living people
Swedish male sprinters
20th-century Swedish people